Autrey may refer to:

Communes in France
 Autrey, Meurthe-et-Moselle, in Meurthe-et-Moselle
 Autrey, Vosges, in Vosges
 Autrey-le-Vay, in Haute-Saône
 Autrey-lès-Cerre, in Haute-Saône
 Autrey-lès-Gray, in Haute-Saône

Surname
 Billy Autrey, American football player
 Gene Autry, American actor
 Latta Malette Autrey, American politician
 Scott Autrey
 Wesley Autrey

Given name
 Autrey Nell Wiley

Other uses
 Autrey Mill Middle School